The Gambian ambassador in Beijing is the official representative of the Government in Banjul to the Government of the People's Republic of China.

The surface of Gambia (10,380 square kilometers) is the smallest of the states of continental Africa.

History 
In 1968 the governments in Banjul and Taipei established diplomatic relations.
On November 5, 1969 opened the Taiwanese Embassy in Banjul.
On October 25, 1971 the representative of the government in Beijing replaced the representative of the government in Taipei in the United Nations as representative of China.
Following the 1972 Nixon visit to China the anglophone governments recognized the government in Beijing as the representative of China.
On December 28, 1974, governments in Banjul and Taipei severed diplomatic relations.
On 30 December 1974 the Embassy of Taiwan in Banjul close.
On 14 December 1974 the governments in Beijing (People's Republic of China) and Banjul established diplomatic relations.
On July 25, 1995, one year after the July 13, 1995, when Yahya Jammeh has couped the government, Banjul and Beijing broke diplomatic relations.
On August 21, 1995 Taiwan opened its embassy in Banjul.
From July 13, 1995 to 15 November 2013 Yahya Jammeh recognized the government in Taipei (Taiwan).

List of representatives

References 

Ambassadors of the Gambia to China
China
Gambia the